James Bray Baker (1792 – 30 January 1839) was an English cricketer who played first-class cricket from 1816 to 1828. He was born at Hailsham in Sussex and was mainly associated with Sussex cricket teams.

Baker played in 15 first-class matches, making his first-class debut for a Sussex side against Epsom at Lord's in 1816. He played seven matches for Sussex sides, making his final first-class appearance for the side in 1828 against an England XI. He played four matches for The Bs against England XIs, and four for Kent sides, all as a given man against Sussex in 1825 and 1826 in matches organised by the Hawkhurst club, the first matches played between two county sides since the end of the Napoleonic Wars. Baker was a member of the Hawkhurst side; the village is in Kent, and the cricket team was considered one of the best sides in England at the time. He scored a total of 219 runs in 27 innings with a batting average of 8.42 runs per innings.

Baker was a member of the Sussex team in two of the three roundarm trial matches against England teams in 1827 played to decide whether roundarm bowling should be legalised. He was described as a "capital but not very safe hitter and a safe field" and was originally a farmer before becoming a publican in Hailsham later in life. He died in the village in January 1839.

Notes

References

Bibliography
Association of Cricket Statisticians and Historians (ACS) (1985) A Guide to Important Cricket Matches Played in the British Isles, 1709–1863 (second edition). Nottingham: ACS. (Available online. Retrieved 2022-04-04.)
Birley D (1999) A Social History of English Cricket. London: Aurum Press. 
Carlaw D (2020) Kent County Cricketers A to Z. Part One: 1806–1914 (revised edition), pp. 37–38. (Available online at the Association of Cricket Statisticians and Historians. Retrieved 2020-12-21.)
Milton H (1992) Cricket Grounds of Kent. Nottingham: The Association of Cricket Statisticians and Historians. (Available online. Retrieved 2022-04-04.)
Moore D (1988) The History of Kent County Cricket Club. London: Christopher Helm. 

1792 births
1839 deaths
English cricketers
English cricketers of 1787 to 1825
English cricketers of 1826 to 1863
Kent cricketers
Sussex cricketers
People from Hailsham
The Bs cricketers